Richard Alexander Conrad Bernhard Burkard von Müllenheim-Rechberg (Spandau, 25 June 1910 — Herrsching am Ammersee, 1 June 2003) was a German diplomat and author. After his career as a naval officer in the Kriegsmarine, he entered the diplomatic career of the Federal Republic of Germany. He was the highest-ranking survivor of the battleship Bismarck.

Early life 
Burkard Freiherr von Müllenheim-Rechberg was a member of the Müllenheim family, an old protestant family which originated from Alsace. After receiving his Abitur in 1929, he entered the Reichsmarine, the Weimar navy. He became an aide to the German military attaché in London.

Second World War 

At the outbreak of the Second World War, von Müllenheim-Rechberg served on several vessels. In May 1941, he experienced the sinking of the battleship Bismarck as fourth artillery officer with the rank of lieutenant commander, thereby becoming the highest-ranking survivor of the ship. He was rescued by the British cruiser Dorsetshire and, after initial detention in England, was transported to Bowmanville prisoner of war camp in Ontario, Canada, from early April 1942 until it closed in April 1945. He was later brought back to England in spring 1946 in preparation for repatriation. On 1 February 1943, he was promoted to the rank of commander.

Diplomatic career 
From 1947 to 1949, von Müllenheim-Rechberg studied at the University of Frankfurt. In 1949, he passed the state examination in jurisprudence. In 1952, he entered the diplomatic service of the Federal Foreign Office. He was a member of the West German NATO delegation in Paris in 1955 and participated at the NATO conference in Bonn in 1956.

In 1965, he became the West German ambassador to the Democratic Republic of the Congo during the tenure of Moïse Tshombe as a prime minister. von Müllenheim-Rechberg would later write a book about Tshombe's kidnapping by Francis Bodenan in 1967 and his death during his imprisonment in Algeria in 1969.

He continued his diplomatic career as a consul general in Toronto in 1968. That same year, he received the Grand Cross 1st Class of the Federal Republic of Germany. He ended his diplomatic career as his country's ambassador to Tanzania from 1971 to 1975.

Publications

References 

1910 births
2003 deaths
German diplomats
Ambassadors of Germany to the Democratic Republic of the Congo
Ambassadors of West Germany
German battleship Bismarck
Reichsmarine personnel
Kriegsmarine personnel
Grand Crosses 1st class of the Order of Merit of the Federal Republic of Germany
Barons of Germany
People of the Congo Crisis